Hugh Purvis (March 5, 1840 – February 12, 1922) was a United States Marine who received the Medal of Honor for actions on board the  during the United States 1871 expedition to Korea.

Biography

Born in Philadelphia, Pennsylvania, Purvis enlisted in the Marine Corps on October 27, 1869. He reported immediately to the Marine Detachment aboard the USS Alaska soon departing for the Far East. During the punitive expedition to Korea, he took part in the assault on an enemy fort on the Han River. In desperate hand-to-hand fighting, the sailors and Marines stormed the walls of the citadel. Private Purvis ran immediately to the flagstaff which bore the Korean colors and loosed the halyards. He was joined by Cpl Charles Brown, and the two tore down the flag. For his "inspiring and heroic" act, Purvis received the Medal of Honor.

He was discharged in 1873 and served two additional tours with the Marine Corps, 1874 to 1879 and 1879 to 1884, rising to the rank of corporal. He is buried in Saint Annes Cemetery, Annapolis, Maryland.

Namesake
, a U.S. Navy Allen M. Sumner-class destroyer, was named in his honor.
Purvis Road on Marine Corps Base Quantico is named in his honor.

Medal of Honor citation
Rank and organization: Private, U.S. Marine Corps. Born: March 5, 1846, Philadelphia, Pa. Accredited to: Pennsylvania. G.O. No.: 169, February 8, 1872.

Citation:

On board the U.S.S. Alaska during the attack on and capture of the Korean forts, 11 June 1871. Braving the enemy fire, Purvis was the first to scale the walls of the fort and capture the flag of the Korean forces.

See also

List of Medal of Honor recipients

Notes

References

General Orders and Circulars Issued by the Navy Department

1840 births
1922 deaths
United States Marine Corps Medal of Honor recipients
United States Marines
Military personnel from Philadelphia
Korean Expedition (1871) recipients of the Medal of Honor